George Albert "Lefty" Tyler (December 14, 1889 – September 29, 1953) was a professional baseball pitcher from 1910 to 1921.

From 1910 to 1917, Tyler played with the Boston Doves/Braves. He performed well, having an earned run average (ERA) under 3 in all but two years. In 1918, Tyler was traded to the Chicago Cubs for Larry Doyle, Art Wilson, and $15,000. Tyler did well in Chicago as well, having ERA's under 4.

Tyler's career earned run average was 2.95. His brother, Fred Tyler, played in the major leagues in 1914 as a catcher.

In 1914, Tyler was a member of the Braves team that went from last place to first place in two months, becoming the first team to win a pennant after being in last place on the Fourth of July. The team then went on to defeat Connie Mack's heavily favored Philadelphia Athletics in the 1914 World Series.

In 1916, the New York Giants set the current record of 26 consecutive wins without a defeat: Tyler beat them to end the streak on September 30, 1916.

He was the winning pitcher in Game 2 of the 1918 World Series for the Cubs, as well as the hard-luck loser of a 2-1 decision in Game 6, the last game of the Series; it was the last win for the opposing Boston Red Sox until 2004.

Tyler was a better than average hitting pitcher in his 12-year major league career, compiling a .217 batting average (189-for-870) with 85 runs, 4 home runs and 73 RBI. He recorded a career-high 20 RBI as a member of the 1916 Boston Braves.

References

External links

Baseball-Reference

1889 births
1953 deaths
Major League Baseball pitchers
Boston Doves players
Boston Rustlers players
Boston Braves players
Chicago Cubs players
Baseball players from New Hampshire
Minor league baseball managers
Lowell Tigers players
Rochester Colts players
Lawrence Merry Macks players
People from Derry, New Hampshire
Sportspeople from Rockingham County, New Hampshire
Pinkerton Academy alumni